Spencer Township is one of the twelve townships of Allen County, Ohio, United States. The 2010 census found 3,067 people in the township, 844 of whom lived in the unincorporated portions of the township.

Geography
Located in the southwestern corner of the county, it borders the following townships:
Marion Township - northeast
Amanda Township - east
Logan Township, Auglaize County - southeast
Salem Township, Auglaize County - southwest
Jennings Township, Van Wert County - west

The village of Spencerville is located in southern Spencer Township.

Name and history
Statewide, other Spencer Townships are located in Guernsey, Lucas, and Medina counties and formerly in Hamilton County.

Government
The township is governed by a three-member board of trustees, who are elected in November of odd-numbered years to a four-year term beginning on the following January 1. Two are elected in the year after the presidential election and one is elected in the year before it. There is also an elected township fiscal officer, who serves a four-year term beginning on April 1 of the year after the election, which is held in November of the year before the presidential election. Vacancies in the fiscal officership or on the board of trustees are filled by the remaining trustees.

References

External links
Allen County website

Townships in Allen County, Ohio
Townships in Ohio